Naphthoylindoles are a class of synthetic cannabinoids.

See also
 Structural scheduling of synthetic cannabinoids

References